This is a List of the Companions of the Liberation, which consist of people, communities and military units that have been awarded the Ordre de la Libération.

1038 people, 5 cities, and 18 military units have been awarded Compagnons de la Libération. Amongst the 1038 Compagnons, 271 have been awarded posthumously, 60 were not French at the time they were awarded and six are women. The last surviving member of the order, Hubert Germain, died on the 12th of October 2021.

People

A
André Aalberg
Michel Abalan
Valentin Abeille
José Aboulker
Robert Abraham

Alain Agenet
Edouard Ahnne
Raymond Appert
Marcel Albert
Berty Albrecht
Blaise Alexandre
Roland Alibert de Falconnet
Émile Allegret
Roger Alloues
Henri Amiel
Dimitri Amilakvari
René Amiot
Hubert Amyot D'Inville
Louis Andlauer
Gustave André
Roger André
Jacques Andrieux
Pierre Anglade
Bernard Anquetil
Roméo Antoniotti
Paul Appert
Pierre Arainty
Paul Aribaud
Louis Armand
Michel Arnaud
Paul Arnault
Pierre Arrighi
François Arzel
Henri d'Astier de la Vigerie
François d’Astier de la Vigerie
Emmanuel d'Astier de la Vigerie
Jean Astier de Villatte
Pierre Aubertin
Philippe Auboyneau
Antoine Avinin
Fernand Aymé
Jean Ayral

B
Gabriel Bablon
René Babonneau
Joseph Bakos
Jean Ballarin
André Ballatore
Jacques Ballet
Bernard Barberon
Roger Barberot
Gustave Barlot
Raymond Basset
Paul Batiment
Jacques Bauche
Guy Baucheron de Boissoudy
René Bauden
René Baudry
Jacques Baumel
Georges Bavière
Maurice Bayrou
Jean de Bazelaire de Ruppierre
Jacques Beaudenom de Lamaze
Henri Beaugé-Berubé
Pierre Beaugrand
Jean Bécourt-Foch
Didier Béguin
Louis Béguin
Valentin Béhélo
Mohamed Bel Hadj
Jean Bellec
Émile Bellet
Louis Bénard
Auguste Bénébig
Henri Benevene
Lionel Beneyton
Pierre de Bénouville
Raoul Béon
Frédéric Bergamin
Georges Bergé
Jean-Pierre Berger
André Bergeret
Pierre Bernard
Claude Bernard
Philippe Bernardino
Adrien Bernavon
Lucien Berne
Pierre Bernheim
Lucien Bernier
Pierre Bertaux
Jean Bertin
Jean Bertoli
Antonin Betbeze
Antoine Béthouart
Pierre Beucler
Georges Bidault
François Bigo
Pierre Billotte
Abel Billy
Robert Bineau
Jacques Bingen
François Binoche
Roger Birot
Antoine Bissagnet
Arnaud Bisson
André Blanchard
René Blanchard
Pierre Blanchet
Jacques Blasquez
Sigismond Blednicki
Louis Blesy
Maurice du Boisrouvray
Alain de Boissieu
François Bolifraud
Émile Bollaert
André Bollier
Michel Bollot
Paul Bonaldi
Georges Bonnet
 
Maurice Bonte
Louis Bonvin
François Boquet
Henri Bordas
Sidiki Boubakari
Jean Bouchez
Claude Bouchinet-Serreules
Michel Boudier
André Boulloche
Henri Bouquillard
Claude Bourdet
Jacques Bourdis
Henri Bourgeois
Maurice Bourgès-Maunoury
Pierre-Louis Bourgoin
Pierre Bourgoin
Augustin Bourrat
Édouard Bourret
Émile Bouthemy
Léon Bouvier
René Bouvret
Laurent Bovis
André Boyer
Jacques Branet
Gabriel Branier
Jean Brasseur
Raphaël Briard
Roger Brias
Charles Bricogne
Martial Brigouleix
René Briot
Pierre Briout
Pierre Brisdoux Galloni d'Istria
Félix Broche
Diego Brosset
Pierre Brossolette
Louis Broudin
Amédée Brousset
André Brunel
Gabriel Brunet de Sairigné
Jacques Brunschwig-Bordier
Augusto Bruschi
Pierre Brusson
Paul Buffet-Beauregard
Martial Bugeac
Georges Buis

C
Georges Cabanier
Jean Cadéac d'Arbaud
René Cailleaud
Michel de Camaret
Lucien Cambas
Gustavo Camerini
Jean-Claude Camors
Joseph Canale
Georges Canepa
André Cantes
Jean Capagory
Michel Carage
Roger Carcassonne-Leduc
Jean-Claude Carrier
Joseph Casile
René Casparius
René Cassin
Jean Cassou
Noël Castelain
Georges Catroux
Jean Cavaillès
Alfred Cazaud
Roger Ceccaldi
Jean Cédile
Jacques Chaban-Delmas
Julien Chabert
Albert Chambonnet
Jean-Louis Chancel
Claude Chandon
Pol Charbonneaux
Albert Chareyre
Guy Charmot
Henri Chas
Pierre Château-Jobert
Guy Chauliac
Guy Chaumet
Paul Chausse
Albert Chavanac
Eugène Chavant
Guy Chavenon
Paul Chenailler
Camille Chevalier
Maurice Chevance-Bertin
Bernard Chevignard
Pierre de Chevigné
Gilbert Chevillot
Geoffroy Chodron de Courcel
Maurice Choron
Winston Churchill
Maurice Claisse
Roland Claude
Eugène Claudius-Petit
Charles Clerc
Charles Cliquet
Francis-Louis Closon
Pierre Clostermann
Jean Clouet des Pesruches
Jean Coggia
Philibert Collet
Constant Colmay
Charles Colonna d'Istria
Paulin Colonna d'Istria
Jean Colonna d'Ornano
Adrien Conus
Roger Coquoin
Daniel Cordier
Jean-Marie Corlu
Édouard Corniglion-Molinier
Renaud de Corta]
Louis Cortot
Henri Cotteret
Christian Coudray
Hervé Coué
Émile Coulaudon
Jean Coupigny
Pierre Cournarie
Paul Courounet
Edmond Coussieu
Robert Cremel
Jean Crépin
Roger Crivelli
René Crocq
Irénée Cros
Michel Cruger
Robert Cunibil
Camille Cunin

D
 
 
 
 Yves de Daruvar
 Edmond Debeaumarché
 
 
 
 
 Émile Degand
 
 
 
 Pierre Dejussieu-Pontcarral
 
 
 Raymond Delange
Charles Delestraint
 Raymond Deleule
 
 
 
 
 Pierre Delsol
 
 
 
 
 Jean Desmaisons
  (1919–2018)
 Lucien Detouche
 Robert Détroyat
 
 André Devigny
 André Dewavrin ("Passy")
 
 Laure Diebold
 Thadée Diffre
 Louis Dio
 Daniel Divry
 
 
 
 
 
 Jean Dreyfus
 François Drogou
 Raymond Dronne
 Henri Drouilh
 
 Raoul Duault
  (1896–1971)
 
 
 
 
 
 François Dumont
 
 
 René Dupont

E
Félix Éboué
Hermann Eckstein
Albert Eggenspiller
Rudolph Eggs
Dwight D. Eisenhower
Constant Engels
Jean Eon
Juan-José Espana
Henri Honoré d'Estienne d'Orves
Jules Evenou
Yves Ezanno

F
Yves Farge
Henry Farret
Marceau Faucret
Michel Faul
Philippe Fauquet
François Faure
Benjamin Favreau
Emile Fayolle
Constantin Feldzer
Louis Ferrant
Joseph de Ferrières de Sauveboeuf
Henri Fertet (1926-1943), French Resistance fighter
Jean Fèvre
Marcel Finance
Louis Finite
Pierre Finite
Paul Flandre
Guy Flavien
Jacques Florentin
Louis Flury-Hérard
Raphaël Folliot
Albert Fossey
Henri Fougerat
François Fouquat
Claudius Four
Pierre Fourcaud
Michel Fourquet
Jean Fournier
Louis Fournier de la Barre
Pierre Fourrier
Yvan Franoul
Philippe Fratacci
Henri Frenay
Geoffroy Frotier de Bagneux
Henri Fruchaud
Bernard Fuchs
Roger Furst

G
Pierre Gabard
Adolphe Gaétan
André Gallas
Robert Galley
Gilbert Garache
Pierre Garbay
François Garbit
Roger Gardet
Henri Garnier
Romain Gary
René Gatissou
Gontran Gauthier
Marcel Gayant
Alain Gayet
Jean Gemahling
André Genet
René Génin
Louis Gentil
André Geoffroy
George VI
André Gerberon
Hubert Germain
René Gervais
Raymond Gibert-Seigneureau
Jean Gilbert
Xavier Gillot
Ernest Gimpel
Emile Ginas
Alexandre Gins
Noël Giorgi
Arthur Giovoni
Nicolas de Glos
Louis Godefroy
André-Jean Godin
Joseph de Goislard de Monsabert
Charles Gonard
Henri Gorce-Franklin
Jean Gosset
Jean de Goujon de Thuisy
William Gould
Georges Goumin
François Goussault
Georges Goychman
Toussaint Gozzi
Albert Grand
Gilbert Grandval
Georges Grasset
André Gravier
Paul Grenier
Alain Grout de Beaufort
Marcel Guaffi
Max Guedj
Yves Guellec
Alphonse Guéna
Paul Guénon
Claude Guérin
René Gufflet
Gaston Guigonis
Pierre Guilhemon
Roger Guillamet
Maurice Guillaudot
Jacques de Guillebon
Paul Guillon
Marcel Guillot
Maxime Guillot
Auguste Guillou
Georges Guingouin
Jean Guyot
Marius Guyot

H
Joseph Hackin
Marie Hackin
Maurice Halna du Fretay
Emmanuel d’Harcourt
Bernard Harent
Olivier Harty de Pierrebourg
John F. Hasey
Arnauld Haudry de Soucy
Pierre de Hauteclocque
Pierre Hautefeuille
Yves de la Hautière (Carré de Lusançay dit)
Jacques Hazard
Bernard Hébert
Jacques Hébert
Gérard Hennebert
Mathurin Henrio
Marcelle Henry
Pierre-Jean Herbinger
Georges Héritier
Jean d'Hers
Robert Hervé
Yves Hervé
Claude Hettier de Boislambert
Alfred Heurteaux
Jean-Marie Heyrend
Jules Hirleman
Georges Hugo
François d'Humières

I
Paul Ibos
Albert Idohou
Pierre Iehlé
André Ima
François Ingold
Henry Ingrand
Victor Iturria

J
Henri Jaboulay
André Jacob
François Jacob
Paul Jacquier
Rodolphe Jaeger
André Jamme
Jean Jaouen
Félix Jaquemet
André Jarrot
Edmond Jean
Georges Jeanperrin
Jean Jestin
Marcel Jeulin
Bertrand Jochaux du Plessis
Jules Joire
Paul Joly
Paul Jonas
Augustin Jordan
Jacques Joubert des Ouches
Georges Jouneau
Paul Jourdier
Germain Jousse
Pierre Julitte
Yves Jullian
Robert Jumel

K
André Kailao
Maurice Kaouza
Henri Karcher
Jean Kerléo
Philippe Kieffer
Auguste Kirmann
Robert Kaskoreff
Imre Kocsis
Marie Pierre Kœnig
Jules de Koenigswarter
Albert Kohan
Yorgui Koli
Marcel Kollen
Dominique Kosseyo
Georges Koudoukou
Paul Koudoussaragne
Alexandre Krementchousky

L
Henri Labit
François de Labouchère
René La Combe
Emile Laffon
Henry Lafont
Pierre Lafont
Yves Lagatu
Roger de la Grandière
André Lalande
Georges Lamarque
Claude Lamirault
Marcel Langer
Pierre Langlois
Xavier Langlois
Jacques Langlois de Bazillac
Roger Lantenois
Jean Laquintinie
Edgard de Larminat
Jean de Lattre de Tassigny
Edouard Laurent
Jean-Claude Laurent-Champrosay
Henri Laurentie
Pierre Laureys
Roger Lavenir
André Lavergne
Albert Lebon
Philippe Leclerc de Hauteclocque
Charles Le Cocq
Jacques Lecompte-Boinet
Guy Le Coniac de la Longrays
Yves Le Dû
Pierre Lefaucheux
Marcel Lefèvre
Paul Legentilhomme
Yves Léger
Charles Le Goasguen
Pierre Le Gourierec
Michel Legrand
Claude Le Hénaff
Jean Lejeune
Paul Leistenschneider
Jacques Lemarinel
Jules Le Mière
René Lemoine
René Lenoir
René Lepeltier
Joseph Léonard
Aimé Lepercq
Claude Lepeu
Pierre Lequesne
Georges Le Sant
Roger Lescure
René Lesecq
Joël Le Tac
Jean Levasseur
Jean-Pierre Lévy
Roger Lévy
Henri Lévy-Finger
Jean Lhuillier
André Lichtwitz
Lucien Limanton
Hugues Limonti
Albert Litas
Albert Littolff
Philippe Livry-Level
Alexandre Lofi
Pierre Louis-Dreyfus (1908-2011)
Edmond Louveau
Jean Lucchesi
Yves Lucchesi
André Lugiez
Charles Luizet

M
Edmond Magendie
Louis Magnat
Jean Magne
Henri Magny
Yves Mahé
Jacques Maillet
Henri Maillot
Louis Mairet
Pierre de Maismont
Stanislas Malec-Natlacen
Henri Malin
Horace Mallet
Jean-Pierre Mallet
André Malraux
Stanislas Mangin
Henri Manhès
Henri Manigart
Jacques Mansion
Claude Mantel
Henri Marais
Robert Marchand
Jean Maridor
Pierre Marienne
Philippe Marmissolle-Daguerre
Gérard Marsault
Paul Marson
Albert Marteau
Christian Martell
François Martin
Marc Martin-Siegfried
Albert Marty
Louis Masquelier
Olivier Massart
Raymond Massiet
Robert Masson
Jacques Massu
Antoine Masurel
Roger Mathieu
Jacques Mathis
Joseph Maugard
Charles Mauric
Michel Maurice-Bokanowski
Roger Maylie
André Mazana
Alphée Maziéras
Christian Megret de Devise
Paul Mélis
Jacques Menestrey
François de Menthon
Edouard Méric
Pierre Messmer
Raymond Meyer
Paul-Hémir Mezan
Louis Michard
Simone Michel-Lévy
Paul Milleliri
Jean de Milleret
Victor Mirkin
Pierre Moguez
Mohammed V
Roger Mompezat
Raoul Monclar
René Mondenx
Georges Moneger
Henri Monfort
Xavier de Montbron
Fred Moore
Yvon Morandat
Émilienne Moreau-Evrard
André Morel
René Morel
Théodose Morel
François Morel-Deville
Paul Morlon
Roger Motte
Jacques Mouchel-Blaisot
René Mouchotte
Jean Moulin
André Moulinier
André Mounier
Mouniro
Yves Mourier
Léonel de Moustier
Jean des Moutis
André Moynet
Jean Mufraggi
Henri Muller
Jules Muracciole
Émile Muselier

N
Jean Nanterre
René de Naurois
Léon Nautin
Némir
Edmond Nessler
Jean Netter
Paul Neuville
Jean-Bernard Ney
Louis Nicolas
René Nicolau
Alfred Noël
Robert Noireau
Lucien Nouaux
Noukoun Kone
Jean-Pierre Nouveau

O
Paul Oddo
Aloysius Odervole
Pierre Olivier
Marc O’Neill
Jean Orbello
Marcel Orsini
Paul Ortoli
Louis Oubre

P
René Pailleret
Gaston Palewski
Pierre Pannetier
André Parant
Gilbert Parazols
Jacques Pâris de Bollardière
Alexandre Parodi
René Parodi
André Patou
Joseph Paturau
Joseph Pécro
René Peeters
Louis Pélissier
Adrien Peltier
Pierre Pène
Joseph Perceval
Achille Peretti
Etelvino Perez
Victor Perner
Jacques Pernet
Elie Péju
François Péron
Antoine Péronne
Guy Pérotin
Raymond Perraud
Jacques Petitjean
René Petre
François Philippe
Michel Pichard
Olivier de Pierrebourg
Jacques Piette
Charles Pijeaud
Alfred Pillafort
Jean Pillard
Christian Pineau
Edmond Pinhède
Edouard Pinot
Stéphane Piobetta
Hippolyte Piozin
Jean-Charles Plantevin
René Pleven
Roger Podeur
Raymond Pognon
Jean Poirel
René Poitevin
Pierre Poletti
Jean Pompei
Dominique Ponchardier
Pierre Ponchardier
Edmond Popieul
André Postel-Vinay
Joseph Pouliquen
Pierre Pouyade
Roland de la Poype
Paul Prets
Moïse Priez
Corentin Prigent
Maurice Prochasson
Georges Prost
Jean Proszeck
Ernest Pruvost
Pierre Puech-Samson
Joseph Putz
Lazare Pytkowicz

Q
René Quantin
André Quelen
Jean-Marie Querville
Robert Quilichini
Andre Quirot

R
Philippe Ragueneau
Henri de Rancourt de Mimerand
Claude Raoul-Duval
Pierre Rateau
Serge Ravanel
Laurent Ravix
Georges-Louis Rebattet
Louis Rebour
David Régnier
Eugène Reilhac
Alfred Reilinger
Jean Rémy
Jacques Renard
Gilbert Renault
Henri Rendu
Jacques Renouvin
Jean-Gabriel Revault d'Allonnes
Tibor Revesz-Long
Jean Rey
Louis Ricardou
Noël Riou
Joseph Risso
Roger Ritoux-Lachaud
Louis Rivié
Paul Rivière
Jacques Robert
Maurice Rolland
Henri Rol-Tanguy
Henri Romanetti
Henri Romans-Petit
André Rondenay
Paul-Jean Roquère
Philippe Roques
Raymond Roques
Jean Rosenthal
Jean-Pierre Rosenwald
Pierre Rosset-Cournand
Robert Rossi
Charles Rossignol
Georges Rossignol
Elie Rouby
Jacques Rouleau
Jacques Roumeguère
Nicolas Roumiantzoff
Remy Roure
Jean Rousseau-Portalis
Antoine Rousselot
Henri Rousselot
André Roux
Robert de Roux
André Roux
François Rozoy
Henry de Rudelle
Charles Rudrauf
Pierre Ruibet
Josef Rysavy

S
Raymond Sabot
Bernard Saint-Hillier
Pierre de Saint-Mart
Jean Sainteny
Jules Saliège
André Salvat
Marcel Sammarcelli
Charles Santini
Maurice Sarazac
Jean-Pierre Sartin
Philippe Sassoon
Robert Saunal
Michel Sauvalle
Henri Sautot
Alain Savary
Albert Savary
Horace Savelli
Jacques Savey
Fred Scamaroni
Henri Schaerrer
Alfred de Schamphelaëre
Jacques-Henri Schloesing
Etienne Schlumberger
Paul Schmidt
André Schock
Maurice Schumann
Philippe de Scitivaux
Xavier de Scitivaux
Jacques de Segrais
François Seité
Henri Serizier
Charles Serre
Jacques Sevestre
Adolphe Sicé
Henri Silvy
Jean Silvy
Henry Simon
Jean Simon
Jean-Salomon Simon
Henri Simon-Dubuisson
Pierre Simonet
Roger Sinaud
François Sommer
Pierre Sonneville
Jean Soubervielle
Jacques Soufflet
Henri Soulat
Jean-Louis Sourbieu
Jacques de Stadieu
Michel Stahl
Marcel Suarès

T
Benjamin Tagger
Marcel Taillandier
Joseph Tardieu
René Tardy
Jacques Tartière
Pierre Tassin de Saint-Péreuse
Gaston Tavian
Jacques Tayar
Georges William Taylor
Auguste Techer
Jean de Tedesco
Aimé Teisseire
Pierre-Henri Teitgen
Teriieroo a Teriierooiterai
Roland Terrier
Alexandre Ter Sarkissoff
Charles de Testa
Gérard Théodore
Fernand Thévenet
Pol Thibaux
Gabriel Thierry
Georges Thierry d'Argenlieu
Denis Thiriat
Félix Tilly
Ettore Toneatti
Louis Torcatis
Elie Touchaleaume
Alfred Touny
Roger Touny
Raymond Tournier
Henri Tourtet
Martin Touzeau
Jean Tranape
Joseph Trigeaud
Paul Tripier
René Troël
Jacques Trolley de Prévaux
Pierre Troquereau
Jean Tulasne
Jaime Turrell y Turrull
Edgard Tupët-Thomé

U
Pierre-Paul Ulmer
Georges Ungerman

V
Martial Valin
François Vallée
François Valli
Lucien Vanner
André Varnier
Etienne de Vaux
Bohumil Vazac
Gaston Vedel
Gilbert Védy
Jacques de Vendeuvre
Michel Vergès
Joseph Vergos
Richard Verheust
Henri Verdier
Firmin Vermeil
Jean-Pierre Vernant
Jean Vernier
André Verrier
Michel Verstraete
Adolphe Vézinet
Jean Vialard-Goudou
Paul Vibert
Pierre Viénot
Charles Vignes
Daniel Vigneux
Angel Villerot
Harry de Villoutreys
Henri Viltard
Marcel Vincent
Alban Vistel
Jean Volvey
Jean Vourc’h
Jacques Voyer

W
Agoussi Wabi
Otto Wagner
René Wagner
Aloïzo Waleina
René Weil
René-Georges Weill
Robert Weill
James Worden
Roger Wybot
Nicolas Wyrouboff

Z
André Zirnheld

Communities
Grenoble
Île de Sein
Nantes
Paris
Vassieux-en-Vercors

Military units

French Army
 Bataillon de Marche n°2
 13th Foreign Legion Demi-Brigade
 Bataillon d’Infanterie de Marine et du Pacifique
 Régiment de marche du Tchad
 2nd Colonial Infantry Regiment
 1st Colonial Artillery Regiment
 1/3ème Régiment d’Artillerie Coloniale
 1st Moroccan Spahi Regiment
 501e Régiment de chars de combat

French Air Force
 1ère Escadrille de Chasse
 Régiment de Chasse Normandie-Niemen
 2ème Régiment de Chasseurs Parachutistes de l’Armée de l’Air
 Groupe de Bombardement Lorraine
 Groupe de Chasse Ile-de-France
 Groupe de Chasse Alsace

French Navy
 Sous-marin Rubis
 Corvette Aconit
 1er Régiment de Fusiliers Marins

References